The Wärtsilä RT-flex96C is a two-stroke turbocharged low-speed diesel engine designed by the Finnish manufacturer Wärtsilä.  It is designed for large container ships that run on heavy fuel oil.  Its largest 14-cylinder version is 13.5 meters high, 26.59 meters long, weighs over 2,300 tonnes, and produces 80.08 megawatts.  The engine is the largest reciprocating engine in the world.

The 14-cylinder version first entered commercial service in September 2006 aboard the Emma Mærsk. The design is similar to the older RTA96C engine, but with common rail technology (in place of traditional camshaft, chain gear, fuel pump and hydraulic actuator systems). This provides maximum performance at lower revolutions per minute (rpm), reduces fuel consumption and emits lower levels of harmful emissions.

The engine has crosshead bearings so the always-vertical piston rods create a tight seal under the pistons. Consequently, the lubrication of the engine is split: the cylinders and the crankcase use different lubricants, each being specialised for its designated role. The cylinders are lubricated by continuous timed injection of consumable lubricant, formulated to protect the cylinders from wear and to neutralise the acids formed during combustion of the high-sulfur fuels commonly used. The crosshead design reduces sideways forces on the piston, keeping diametral cylinder liner wear down to about 30 μm per 1000 hours.

As a piston descends, it compresses incoming combustion air for the adjacent cylinders.  This also serves to cushion the piston as it approaches bottom dead centre, thereby removing some load from the bearings.  The engine is uniflow-scavenged by way of exhaust valves that are operated by electronically controlled hydraulics, thus eliminating the camshaft.  

As of 2006, more than 300 RT-flex96C engines and older RTA96C engines were in service or on order.

Technical data (as of 2008)

See also
 Forced induction
 History of the internal combustion engine

Notes

References

External links
Wärtsilä.com
Wärtsilä RT-flex96C / RTA96C
The Most Powerful Diesel Engine in the World, Todd Walke
Gallery of 8 images

Rta96c
Two-stroke diesel engines
Marine diesel engines
Products introduced in 2006
14-cylinder engines